The Italian general election of 2018 took place on 4 March 2018.

In its two single-seat constituencies, Aosta Valley elected Elisa Tripodi (Five Star Movement) to the Chamber of Deputies and re-elected Albert Lanièce (Valdostan Union, Aosta Valley coalition) to the Senate. Tripodi was the first woman to be elected from the region and the first candidate not supported by a regionalist coalition.

Results
Chamber of Deputies

Source: 

Senate

Source: 

2018 elections in Italy
Elections in Aosta Valley
March 2018 events in Italy